Bernardo de Irigoyen is a town (comuna) in the center-east of the province of Santa Fe, Argentina.

The town was founded in 1886, as the Buenos Aires–Tucumán railway reached the area. It was named after diplomat and politician Bernardo de Irigoyen, who donated lands for the town. It gained the official status of commune in 1923.

Bernardo de Irigoyen hosts an annual Bronc Riding and Folk Music Festival, in the second half of February, and celebrates the day of its patron, the Nativity of the Child Virgin Mary, on 8 September.

References
 
 

Populated places in Santa Fe Province